Zemzem is both a given name and a surname. Notable people with the name include:

Zemzem Ahmed (born 1984), Ethiopian steeplechase runner and road runner
Fevzi Zemzem (1941–2022), Turkish footballer

See also
Zemzemi (surname)